Passion is a 1951 French drama film directed by Georges Lampin and starring Viviane Romance, Clément Duhour and Paul Frankeur. The film's sets were designed by the art director Robert Clavel.

Cast
 Viviane Romance as Marie Charbonnier
 Clément Duhour as 	Gérard Latour
 Paul Frankeur as 	Jacques Charbonnier
 Jean Brochard as 	Le directeur de la prison
 Claire Olivier as Georgette Lamy
 André Carnège as Le président de la Cour
 Marcel Raine as Me. Dalmet
 Daniel Crouet as 	Me. Barbier
 France Descaut as 	Soeur Dominique
 Jacques Gencel as Le petit Louis
 René Hell as Le bistrot
 Christian Simon as  Christian
 André Darnay as l'avocat général
 Odette Barencey as Madame Latour

References

Bibliography
 Oscherwitz, Dayna & Higgins, MaryEllen. The A to Z of French Cinema. Scarecrow Press, 2009.

External links 
 

1951 films
French drama films
1950s French-language films
1951 drama films
Films directed by Georges Lampin
1950s French films